These are the Irish Recorded Music Association's number one albums of 2010, per the Top 100 Individual Artist Albums chart.

Number-one albums

See also
2010 in music
List of number-one albums (Ireland)

References

External links
Current Irish Albums Chart – Top 100 Positions

2010 in Irish music
2010